Lydia Marinelli (15 July 1965 - 8 September 2008) was an Austrian historian, editor, academic author and curator.  She also displayed originality and flair as an exhibition organiser.  Her speciality was the history of psychoanalysis.  The most public aspect of her career involved her work as curator of the Sigmund Freud Museum in Vienna.

Lydia Marinelli died young.  Her suicide was followed by heartfelt tributes from fellow scholars.  "Her death", wrote Michael Hagner "... at the age of just forty-three has robbed us of one of the most original humanities scholars ("Geisteswissenschaftlerinnen") of her generation".

Life
Lydia Marinelli was born at Matrei, a relatively isolated little town north of Lienz, high in the mountains of East Tyrol.  There were at least four siblings.  She studied History, Literature and Philosophy at the University of Vienna, graduating in 1990.  In 1992 she took a research fellowship with the Sigmund Freud Society, later becoming a curator at the foundation's Sigmund Freud Museum at Berggasse 19.  Marinelli received her doctorate from the University of Vienna in 1999 for a dissertation entitled "Psyches Kanon – Zur Publikationsgeschichte der Psychoanalyse rund um den Internationalen Psychoanalytischen Verlag", concerning the publications on psychoanalysis produced by the highly influential so-called "International Psychoanalytic Publishing House" which operated in Vienna between 1919 and 1938.  It was characteristic that Marinelli combined her work on the dissertation with a small (and very well reviewed) exhibition on the same themes which she was preparing for the Freud Museum.  The dissertation subsequently provided a basis for several works adapted and published by colleagues after her death.

In 2003/04 Marinelli became "Director of the Research Division" ("wissenschaftliche Leiterin") at the Sigmund Freud Foundation, retaining the post for the rest of her life.

Although the focus of her professional career was on Vienna, Lydia Marinelli was an enthusiastic networker and communicator, notably when it came to encouraging a less polarised and ossified approach to the study of Sigmund Freud.  She was an academic researcher at the Library of Congress in Washington, D.C.  In 2008, shortly before her death, she also became a "visiting scholar" and stipendiate at the Max Planck Institute for the History of Science in Berlin.  She authored a number of papers and articles, sometimes one her own and sometimes jointly with colleagues.  Topics to which she repeatedly returned included the History and Theory of Psychology, Dreams and Sigmund Freud.  She was also constantly fascinated by with continual changes in the history of media treatment of psychology and related subjects.  Her written contributions often coincided with exhibitions that she staged, generally at the Sigmund Freud Museum.  She also taught as an outside lecturer at the University of Vienna.

Exhibitions
Lydia Marinelli became known for the imaginative and thought provoking exhibitions that she staged at the Sigmund Freud Museum.  Many were specialist, tightly targeted and low-key.  At least four of her more substantial exhibitions at the museum attracted wider notice, however:

Notes

References

1965 births
2008 deaths
People from Tyrol (state)
Artists from Vienna
Austrian medical historians
Austrian women historians
20th-century Austrian historians
21st-century Austrian historians
Sigmund Freud
Austrian women editors
Austrian editors
Austrian curators
Austrian women curators
Exhibition designers
Austrian archivists
Austrian journalists
Austrian women journalists
Opinion journalists
Austrian opinion journalists